The 2012–13 season was Cardiff's 86th in the Football League after joining in 1920. Cardiff were in their ninth consecutive season in the second tier following a third consecutive failure in the play-offs. Cardiff went under a "re-branding" during the close season meaning the home colours would be changed to red from the traditional blue, ending 104 years of the tradition. Cardiff were promoted to the Premier League during the season.

Events

This is a list of the significant events to occur at the club during the 2012–13 season, presented in chronological order. This list does not include completed transfers, which are listed in the transfers section below, or match results, which are in the results section.
June
 1 June – The Football League decides to switch back to seven subs for the season, increasing it from five subs used last season.
 4 June – Malky Mackay turns down offer from Norwich City to become manager. Former Cardiff player Kevin Cooper is appointed as Under-21 coach.
 6 June – Cardiff change their home colours from the traditional Blue, White and Yellow to Red and Black as part of an investment plan made by the Malaysian Owners, also the building of a training ground facility is announced to be built. The badge was also changed to feature a larger dragon, meaning the traditional Bluebird is made smaller as a result the Malaysian Owners have put more investment into Cardiff City.
 29 June – Former chairman Sam Hammam rejects the three offers which Cardiff offer to deal with long-term "Langston Debt".

July
 10 July – Cardiff enter talks with South Korean international Kim Bo-Kyung's club Cerezo Osaka over a transfer fee.
 12 July – Under-18 Belgian international keeper Guillaume Hubert joins on trial along with three unnamed French players.
 13 July – Cardiff agree a fee for Kim Bo-Kyung of around £3 million, as confirmed by his Kim's agent.
 15 July – The Cardiff City squad travel to Switzerland for pre-season training. Bids from Fulham for Peter Whittingham are rejected.
 19 July – Cardiff City pull out of bid for Coventry City defender Richard Keogh after refusing to get involved with a wage war with Derby County. A bid from an unnamed Championship club is rejected for Anthony Gerrard and Dulwich Hamlet teenager Omarr Lawson joins on trial.

August
 2 August – Queens Park Rangers striker Heiðar Helguson takes part in a medical and discusses personal terms over a move to Cardiff.
 3 August – A£200,000 bid is rejected from Bristol City and Leicester City for Anthony Gerrard.
 10 August – Cardiff City Stadium officially re-opens as Cardiff take sole ownership of the ground.
 20 August – A£500,000 bid for defender Matthew Connolly is accepted by Queens Park Rangers.
 21 August – Cardiff's bid for Queens Park Rangers winger Tommy Smith stalls.
 30 August – Cardiff agree a fee with West Ham for the transfer of Nicky Maynard.

September
12 September – Financial Director Doug Lee announces resignation at the end of the month with Simon Lim replacing him.
20 September – Nicky Maynard is ruled out for several months with a torn anterior cruciate ligament.

October
1 October – Alan Whiteley steps down as Chief Executive, Simon Lim replaces Whiteley whilst Richard Thompson steps in as acting financial director.
10 October – Academy Manager Neal Ardley leaves to take up a managerial position at AFC Wimbledon.

November
2 November – Dick Bate joins as a new academy manager.
16 November – Stephen Owen-Conway is appointed as a new club director.
23 November – Craig Conway puts in a transfer request, which is rejected by manager Malky Mackay.

January
24 January – Board director Alan Whiteley resigns following being charge for fraud.

March
1 March – Chairman Datuk Chan Tien Ghee resigns.

April
16 April – Cardiff City gain promotion to the Premier League after a 0–0 draw against Charlton Athletic. This marks Cardiff's return to the top flight after a 51-year absence.
20 April – Cardiff City become champions of the Football League Championship after a 1–1 draw away to Burnley.

May
24 May – Geraint Twose and Lee Kendall leave Cardiff City Academy to take up as Coach Education Role with the Football Association and first team goalkeeper coach at Bristol City respectively.

Football League Championship

Standings

Results summary

Result by round

Kit

|
|
|
|
|
|
|
|

Squad

Statistics

|-
|colspan="14"|Players currently out on loan:

|-
|colspan="14"|Players featured for club who have left:

|}

Captains

Goalscorers

Assists

Disciplinary record

Penalties

Suspensions served

International Call-ups

Contracts

Transfers

In

 Total spending:  ~ £10,049,373
Notes
1Although Cardiff didn't specify a contract length, South Wales Echo reported the contract to be three years ending in 2015.
2Although neither club stated a transfer fee, the South Wales Echo reported the fee to be in the excess of a £2,000,000.
3Although officially undisclosed, Zlatko Zahovič, director of Maribor confirmed the fee to be around €2 million (£1,573,373), a record in Slovenian football.
4Although officially undisclosed South Wales Echo reported the transfer to be a free transfer.
5Although officially undisclosed South Wales Echo reported the fee to be £300,000.
6Although officially undisclosed South Wales Echo reported the fee to be £25,000.

Loans In

Out

 Total income:  ~ £1,263,200
Notes
1Both sides published the fee as undisclosed, but BBC Sport reported the transfer to be worth £350,000.

Loans out

Fixtures & Results

Pre-season

Championship

FA Cup

League Cup

Overall summary

Summary

Score overview

Under-21s

Friendlies

Under 21 Premier League Group 2

Honours

Team
 Football League Championship champions

Individual
 February Player of the Month – Fraizer Campbell
 Championship Team of the Year – Mark Hudson & Peter Whittingham
 LMA Championship Manager of the Year – Malky Mackay

Club Awards
 Player of the Year – Mark Hudson

Club
 Family Club of the Year

Club staff

Backroom staff

Board of directors

References

External links
 
 
 

2012-13
2012–13 Football League Championship by team
Welsh football clubs 2012–13 season